

Military units
35th Fighter Wing, an air combat unit of the United States Air Force
35th Infantry Division (United States), a formation of the National Guard since World War I
35th Infantry Regiment (United States), a regiment created on 1 July 1916 at Douglas, Arizona

Mass transit
35th Street station, Metra station in Chicago
35th–Bronzeville–IIT (CTA station) in Chicago on the Green Line
35th/Archer (CTA station) in Chicago  on the Orange Line
Sox–35th (CTA station) in Chicago on the Red Line
Taraval and 35th Avenue station, former light rail station in San Francisco, California